Robert Pintarič (born 25 March 1965) is a Slovenian cyclist. He competed in two events at the 1996 Summer Olympics.

References

External links
 

1965 births
Living people
Slovenian male cyclists
Olympic cyclists of Slovenia
Cyclists at the 1996 Summer Olympics
Sportspeople from Ljubljana
Slovenian cycling coaches